Yellow bell is a common name for several plants with yellow flowers and may refer to:

Allamanda, genus of flowering plants in the dogbane family
Fritillaria pudica, species of flowering sagebrush
Tecoma stans, species of flowering perennial shrub in the trumpet vine family

See also 
 Yellow mountain bell